Kevin Anderson and G.D. Jones were the defending champions, but only Anderson tried to defend his title.
He partnered with Scott Lipsky. They were eliminated already in the first round by Raven Klaasen and Izak van der Merwe.
Martin Emmrich and Andreas Siljeström won this tournament, by defeating Klaasen and van der Merwe 7–5, 6–4 in the final.

Seeds

Draw

Draw

References
 Doubles Draw
 Qualifying Doubles Draw

Knoxville Challenger - Doubles
2009 Doubles